"My Front Porch Looking In" is a song written by Richie McDonald, Frank J. Myers and Don Pfrimmer, and recorded by American country music group Lonestar. It was released in March 2003 as the first single from the band's compilation album From There to Here: Greatest Hits. The song reached the top of the Billboard Hot Country Songs chart and peaked at number 23 on the Billboard Hot 100.

Content
The song describes how the sight of his beautiful wife and two adorable children is far better than anything including his "panoramic view" of his estate or "the paintings from the air, brushed by the hand of God." He also describes that after seeing the whole world, he "can't wait to get back home to the one He made for me."

Music video
The music video was directed by Trey Fanjoy, and premiered on CMT on May 25, 2003. It features the band playing on a front porch in the middle of a city.

Chart positions
"My Front Porch Looking In" debuted at number 48 on the US Billboard Hot Country Singles & Tracks for the week of March 15, 2003.

Weekly charts

Year-end charts

Certifications

References

2003 songs
2003 singles
Lonestar songs
Songs written by Richie McDonald
Songs written by Frank J. Myers
Song recordings produced by Dann Huff
Music videos directed by Trey Fanjoy
Billboard Hot Country Songs number-one singles of the year
BNA Records singles
Songs written by Don Pfrimmer